Vadakkethara  is a village in Thrissur district in the state of Kerala, India.

Demographics
 India census, Vadakkethara had a population of 9422 with 4499 males and 4923 females.

References

Villages in Thrissur district